There is no capital punishment in current Cape Verdean law. The highest sentence is 25 years. The last execution was performed in 1835, when the islands were part of the Portuguese Empire.

References 

Law of Cape Verde
Capital punishment by country
Human rights in Cape Verde